Shartai Jaafar Abdel Hakam is a Sudanese politician who served as governor of West Darfur and Chairperson of the Transitional Darfur Regional Authority (TDRA). He became Chairperson of the authority in December 2010 following the withdrawal of the Sudan Liberation Movement from the Darfur Peace Agreement and the dismissal  of its leader Minni Minnawi from that post. Abdel-Hakam was able to assume the office of Chairman as the Darfur Peace Agreement states that should the position become vacant, one of the Darfur state governors may chair its proceedings. Abdel-Hakam served as chair of the TDRA until the body was reconstituted as the Darfur Regional Authority with Tijani Sese as chair on 20 September 2011.

References

Living people
Sudanese politicians
People from West Darfur
Year of birth missing (living people)